The Kamchia gas field natural gas field located on the continental shelf of the Black Sea. It was discovered in 1993 and developed by PetroCeltic. It began production in 1998 and produces natural gas and condensates. The total proven reserves of the Kamchia gas field are around 172 billion cubic feet (4.9 km³), and production is slated to be around 40 million cubic feet/day (1.1×106m³) in 2015.

References

Black Sea energy
Natural gas fields in Bulgaria
Black Sea Region